Haitian Workers Party (in French: Parti des Travailleurs Haïtiens, abbreviated PTA) was a communist party in Haiti. It was founded in 1966.

Political parties established in 1966
Communist parties in Haiti
Defunct communist parties
Defunct political parties in Haiti
1966 establishments in Haiti